Finisterre, Finistère, Finisterra, or Fisterra may refer to:

Places
 Finistère, a department of France
 Cape Finisterre (Fisterra), a headland in Galicia, northwest Spain
 Fisterra (comarca), a comarca (county) in A Coruña, Galicia
 Fisterra, a municipality in the comarca
 Finisterre, a Shipping Forecast sea area renamed FitzRoy in 2002
 Finisterre Range, a mountain range in Papua New Guinea

Literature
 Finisterra (novelette), a 2007 science-fiction novelette by David Moles
 Finisterre, a poem by Sylvia Plath from her 1971 collection Crossing the Water.
 Finisterre, a 1943 poetry collection by Eugenio Montale
 Finisterre universe, in the fiction of C. J. Cherryh

Music

Albums
 Finisterra (album), a 2000 album by Mägo de Oz
 Finisterre (album), a 2002 album and subsequent film by Saint Etienne
 Finisterre, a 2008 album by Zydepunks
 Finisterre , a 2017 album by Der Weg einer Freiheit

Songs
 "Finisterre", on the 1990 Cooking Vinyl album Freedom and Rain (1990) by June Tabor and The Oyster Band
 "Finisterre", on the 2006 album Memorial (2006) by the Portuguese gothic metal band Moonspell
 "Finisterre", on the 2011 album Touchstones (2011) by German progressive rock band Subsignal

Ships
 HMS Finisterre (D55), a Royal Navy destroyer
 Finisterre, a Carleton Mitchell yacht, the only one to win the Bermuda Race three times in succession (1956–60)
 FV Finisterre, a crabber lost at St. Ives, Cornwall in 1946

Other uses
 Finisterre (retailer), an English ethical clothing company
 Finisterre languages, spoken in New Guinea
 Alejandro Finisterre (1919–2007), inventor of futbolín, a Spanish variant of table football/foosball
 Felix Finisterre, Saint Lucian politician
 Finisterre, a character in the television show The Adventures of Portland Bill (1983)
 Senator Ortolan Finistirre, a character in the novel Thank You for Smoking and its film adaptation

See also
 SS Cap Finisterre, a 1911 German transatlantic ocean liner 
 Finisterres, a 1997 album by Dan Ar Braz
 Finist'air, airline based in Finistère
 FinisTerrae, supercomputer